Exalgina Gambôa is an Angolan judge who presided over the Court of Auditors and served as secretary of state for foreign affairs of Angola. She was appointed judge of the Court of Auditors in 2018 by President João Lourenço on the recommendation of the Superior Council for the Judiciary.

References 

Year of birth missing (living people)
Living people
Angolan judges
Women judges
Angolan women judges